6050 series may refer to:

Japanese train types
 Nagoya Municipal Subway 6050 series EMU
 Nishitetsu 6050 series EMU
 Seibu 6050 series, a development of the Seibu 6000 series EMU
 Tobu 6050 series EMU

ja:6050系